Baura may refer to:

Baura, Ludhiana, a village in Punjab, India
Marina Baura, Venezuelan actress

See also 
 Bhaura (disambiguation)
 Bauria (disambiguation)